Shari Springer Berman (born July 13, 1963) and Robert Pulcini (born August 24, 1964) are an American team of filmmakers.

Biographies 
Both Springer Berman and Pulcini were born in New York, New York. Springer Berman graduated from Wesleyan University (Phi Beta Kappa) and Pulcini graduated from Rutgers University-Camden. Both filmmakers received master's degrees in film from Columbia University. The couple married in 1994. Springer Berman is Jewish, and Pulcini is of Italian descent. 

The two have a "rule" in which they often alternate whose name comes first in the credits of their movies, of which Berman says "There’s no meaning behind it. It’s very random!"

Career
They received critical acclaim and an Academy Award nomination for their 2003 film American Splendor.

In 2010, The Extra Man premiered at the Sundance festival. The Emmy-winning Cinema Verite, a 2011 HBO Drama film directed by Berman and Pulcini, premiered on April 23, 2011.

Beginning in 2019, the pair branched out into directing for television.

Awards and nominations 
With their first feature film American Splendor, Springer Berman and Pulcini earned an Academy Award nomination for Best Adapted Screenplay.

Awards won for American Splendor 
Boston Film Critics (Best Screenplay)
Central Ohio Film Critics (Best Adapted Screenplay)
Chicago Film Critics (Most Promising Performers)
Los Angeles Film Critics (Best Screenplay)
National Society of Film Critics (Best Screenplay)
New York Film Critics (Best First Film)
Online Film Critics (Best Breakthrough Filmmakers)
San Diego Film Critics (Best Adapted Screenplay)
 Sundance Grand Jury Prize (Dramatic)
Toronto Film Critics (Best First Feature)
Writers Guild of America (WGA) (Best Adapted Screenplay)

Filmography

Movies
Off the Menu: The Last Days of Chasen's (1997)
The Young and the Dead (2000) 
Hello, He Lied & Other Truths from the Hollywood Trenches (2002)
American Splendor (2003)
Wanderlust (2006)
The Nanny Diaries (2007)
The Extra Man (2010)
Cinema Verite (2011)
Girl Most Likely (2012)
Ten Thousand Saints (2015)
Things Heard and Seen (2021)

Television 
 Shameless season 9, episode 12 "You'll Know the Bottom When You Hit It" (2019)
 Succession:
 season 2, episode 4 "Safe Room" (2019)
 season 3, episode 4 "Lion in the Meadow" (2021)
Night Sky: season 1, episode 4 "Boilermakers" (2022)
 WeCrashed season 1, episode 8 "The One With all the Money" (2022)

Actor 
 Robert Pulcini
American Splendor (2003) - "Bob the Director"

References

External links

"Interview: Robert Pulcini and Sheri Springer Berman, Directors of 'The Nanny Diaries'", Cinematical, Ryan Stewart, Aug 23rd 2007
"Filmmakers Shari Springer Berman and Robert Pulcini", NPR
"Splendid misery: an interview with Robert Pulcini and Shari Springer Berman." Cineaste, Gilbert, Anne; West, Dennis; West, Joan M., September 22, 2003
"Shari Springer Berman, Robert Pulcini, Paul Giamatti & Harvey Pekar; Raymond Strother; Eugenia Zuckerman", Charlie Rose, (August 19, 2003)

1963 births
1964 births
Screenwriters from New York (state)
Columbia University School of the Arts alumni
American women film directors
Film directors from New York City
Filmmaking duos
Living people
Married couples
Wesleyan University alumni
American women screenwriters
Writers Guild of America Award winners
Rutgers University–Camden alumni
21st-century American women